Racquetball has been included at the Central American and Caribbean Games since 1990. Over that period Mexican players have dominated the podium, winning gold at every event in Men’s and Women’s Doubles, and winning gold in Men’s and Women’s Singles all but two times each. Mexico has also won every gold medal in the Men’s and Women’s Team events. Venezuela has the second most medals in men’s events, while the Dominican Republic has won the second most medals in women’s events.

There was a playoff in Men’s and Women’s Singles and Doubles for the bronze medal the first three times racquetball was in the Central American and Caribbean Games, but in 2002 that playoff was eliminated with both semi-finalists awarded bronze medals.

Medal summary by event

Men's singles

Men's doubles

Men's team

Women's singles

Women's doubles

Women's team

Medal tables

Men’s events

Women’s events

Players who have won 5 or more medals

References

 
Central American and Caribbean Games
Racquetball